Hugo Vegard Vetlesen (born 29 February 2000) is a Norwegian professional footballer who plays as a midfielder for Bodø/Glimt.

Career
On 5 October 2020, Vetlesen left Stabæk to sign for Bodø/Glimt until the end of 2023. On 7 April 2022, Vetlesen headed in the game winning goal in a shock 2–1 victory over Serie A side Roma in the quarter-finals of the UEFA Europa Conference League.

Career statistics

Honours
Bodø/Glimt
Eliteserien: 2020, 2021
Individial
Eliteserien Player of the Year: 2022

References

2000 births
Living people
Sportspeople from Bærum
Norwegian footballers
Association football midfielders
Norway youth international footballers
Norway under-21 international footballers
Eliteserien players
Stabæk Fotball players
FK Bodø/Glimt players